Cimandiri is a village in Panggarangan District, Lebak Regency in Banten Province. Its population is 3846.

Climate
Cimandiri has a tropical rainforest climate (Af) with heavy to very heavy rainfall year-round.

References

Villages in West Java
Populated places in Banten